Vista Alegre District is one of five districts of the province Nazca in Peru.

History 
Vista Alegre District was created by Law 23927 (20 September 1984).

Authorities

Mayors 
 2011-2014: José Luis Gutiérrez Cortez, Partido Regional de Integración (PRI).
 2007-2010: Eusebio Alfonso Canales Velarde.

Festivities 
 Our Lady of Fatima

See also 
 Administrative divisions of Peru

References

External links 
 INEI Peru

1984 establishments in Peru